DZAS (702 AM) is a non-commercial radio station owned and operated by the Far East Broadcasting Company, which it serves as its flagship station. The station's studio is located at the 46th Floor, One Corporate Centre, Meralco Ave. cor. Doña Julia Vargas Ave., Ortigas Center, Pasig, and its transmitter is located along MacArthur Highway, Brgy. Wakas, Bocaue. Few of the station's programs are also aired on cable television via GCTV and TBN Philippines.

Profile
The station began its broadcast on June 4, 1948, under the call letters KZAS, as the lyrics of the hymn “All Hail the Power of Jesus’ Name” wafted in the air for the first time, signaling the beginning of Gospel broadcasts in the country. KZAS eventually came to be known as 680 kilocycles (read "Six-Eighty") DZAS in the year 1948. In November 1978, DZAS moved to the present to frequency of 702 kHz in response to the adoption of the 9 kHz spacing implented by the Geneva Frequency Plan of 1975 on AM radio stations in the Philippines and across the Asia-Pacific region. For seven decades now, (read "Seven-O-Two") 702 DZAS has been providing the Filipino household with news, music, information, and inspiration while sharing the Word of God. It is now one of the oldest radio stations still operating today.

702 DZAS, however, experienced a setback, when the station reduced its broadcast hours in November 2003, owing to its financial difficulties. In January 2004, the station resumed its regular broadcast hours.

In June 2012, DZAS and sister FM station 98.7 DZFE, moved to a new, modern office space located at the One Corporate Centre in Ortigas Center, Pasig to adjust to modern broadcast settings.

References

External links
 DZAS homepage

Radio stations in Metro Manila
Christian radio stations in the Philippines
Radio stations established in 1948
1948 establishments in the Philippines
Far East Broadcasting Company